The Academy of Art University Automobile Museum is a non-profit museum located in San Francisco, California. The museum serves both as a conservator of automotive history and as a tool for students in the industrial design department at the Academy of Art University, particularly those in the Automotive Restoration program. Forbes has estimated the value of the museum's collection to be $70 million. The museum is accessible for the public by appointment at scheduled times.

History 
A former President of the Academy of Art University, Richard A. Stephens, started the museum and is the proprietor of over half of the cars. The Stephens family—including Richard's daughter and current University President Elisa Stephens—began to seriously collect antique cars in the 1990s. The first car purchased for the collection was a 1929 Packard due to its being built the same year that the University was founded by Richard S. Stephens.  In 1999, AAU purchased the main showroom it has today at 1849 Washington Street and then bought additional showroom space in 2012.

In 2016, the museum was described by Hemmings Motor News’ Dan Stoner as being “one of the largest collections of antique cars on the West Coast.”

Currently, the museum has seven full-time workers who maintain and preserve the vehicles.

Exhibits and collections 
The Tucker 48 is one of the museum's most prized vehicles.  The Tucker 48 that the museum has in its display is production car #1003.  The car was purchased at auction for $2,035,000 from the previous owner, George Lucas, who executive produced the 1988 film Tucker: The Man and His Dream.  The car has also been exhibited at the San Francisco International Auto Show, among other car shows.

The museum also exhibits the 1933 Pierce-Arrow Silver Arrow, which can reach a speed of 115 mph and was previously owned and restored by William F. Harrah. Only five of these cars were built in total and today only two others remain.

In 2009, the museum exhibited around 30 cars from the 1930s at the 52nd Annual International Auto Show.

In 2013, 34 vehicles were featured at the International Auto Show presented by AutoTrader.com. The vehicles were chosen by the University's Industrial Design Department Director Tom Matano.  Kevin Diamond, director of the show said:  "We are proud to be able to exhibit vehicles from the museum that represent the elegance, style, craftsmanship, technology and innovative spirit of automotive designers past and present.”

In 2016, over 30 cars from the museum's collection are expected to be displayed at the 59th annual International Auto Show at San Francisco's Moscone Center.

In 2018, Academy of Art University auctioned off 50 cars at Mecum Las Vegas, which was expected to help the organization build a museum to house their collection, as well as trim it down by selling the duplicates and ones that already have other versions of the same model. Early in 2018, Robert Fisher was announced as the new chief executive officer of Academy of Art University Automobile Museum.

Charities 
Proceeds from the museum go to both the Rotary Club and the Boys and Girls Club.  Every $10 admission fee received during the hours it is open to the public each week is donated to these charities.

References

External links 
 Academy of Art University Automobile Museum's official website

Museums in San Francisco
Automobile museums in California
501(c)(3) organizations
University museums in California
Academy of Art University